Cereus fricii is a species of Cereus from Venezuela.

References

External links
 
 

fricii
Flora of Venezuela